The 2015 Andorran local elections were held on 13 December. Voters elected the council members of the seven parishes.

Electoral system
Voters elect the members of the municipal councils (consells de comú in Catalan). The Electoral Law allows the municipal councils to choose their numbers of seats, which must be an even number between 10 and 16.

All city council members are elected in single multi-member districts, consisting of the whole parish, using closed lists. Half of the seats are allocated to the party with the most votes. The other half of the seats are allocated using the Hare quota (including the winning party). With this system the winning party obtains an absolute majority.

The cònsol major (mayor) and the cònsol menor (deputy mayor) are elected indirectly by the municipal councillors.

Results

Overall

Canillo

Encamp

Ordino

La Massana

Andorra la Vella

Sant Julià de Lòria

Escaldes-Engordany

References

External links
Government election website

2015
2015 elections in Europe
2015 in Andorra
December 2015 events in Europe